Kedar Prasad Gupta (born 1964) is an Indian politician. He won the Kurhani Assembly constituency of Bihar Legislative Assembly on December 8, 2022 in the by-election. He is a member of the Bharatiya Janata Party.

References 

Living people
1964 births
Bharatiya Janata Party politicians
People from Muzaffarpur district